John A. Mason House is a historic home located near Farrington, Chatham County, North Carolina. It was built about 1850, and is a two-story, Greek Revival style frame dwelling.  It has a two-story rear ell and another one-story rear section.  The front facade features a one-story, original, hip-roofed porch.

It was listed on the National Register of Historic Places in 1974.

References

Houses on the National Register of Historic Places in North Carolina
Greek Revival houses in North Carolina
Houses completed in 1850
Houses in Chatham County, North Carolina
National Register of Historic Places in Chatham County, North Carolina